K. S. Rao may refer to:

 Kakarla Subba Rao, Indian radiologist
 Karnad Sadashiva Rao, Indian freedom fighter
 Katta Subba Rao, Indian film director
 Kavuri Samba Siva Rao,  Indian politician, engineer and industrialist
 Kitty Shiva Rao, Montessori teacher and later member of the All India Women's Conference
 Koka Subba Rao, former chief justice of India